East Wittering Windmill is a grade II listed tower mill at East Wittering, Sussex, England which is derelict.

History
East Wittering Windmill was first mentioned in 1810. The mill was working by wind until 1895, and the sails were removed in 1896. The cap was blown off in 1931. The derelict tower retained some machinery in 1974, but was burnt out in May 1975, with the windshaft falling within the tower.

Description

East Wittering Windmill is a four-storey cement rendered brick tower mill. It had two Spring sails and two Common sails. The beehive cap was winded by a fantail. The sails were set with the aid of a travelling stage. The mill drove two pairs of underdrift millstones. The derelict tower stands today.

Millers
Robert Woodman 1845
William Stevens 1855
T Souch 1866
R H Sparkes 1870
E Redman 1887
Richard Stevens 1887 - 1895

References for above:-

References

Further reading
 Online version

Industrial buildings completed in 1810
Tower mills in the United Kingdom
Grinding mills in the United Kingdom
Grade II listed buildings in West Sussex
Windmills in West Sussex
Grade II listed windmills